A View from the Bridge is a 1962 drama film directed by Sidney Lumet, based on the Arthur Miller play of the same name. The film was an international co-production between French and Italian studios, with exteriors shot on-location in Brooklyn and interiors filmed in Paris, France. It was written for the screen by Norman Rosten and Jean Aurenche, and stars Raf Vallone as Eddie Carbone, Maureen Stapleton as Beatrice, Carol Lawrence as Catherine, Jean Sorel as Rodolpho, Raymond Pellegrin as Marco, and Morris Carnovsky as Alfieri.

Plot

The Carbones are a working class Italian-American family living in the Red Hook neighborhood of Brooklyn - patriarch Eddie, his wife Beatrice, and their niece Catherine. Eddie is a longshoreman on the waterfront, and he and Beatrice have raised 18-year old Catherine from infancy.

When two of Beatrice's cousins from Sicily, Marco and Rodolpho, illegally enter the United States and take refuge in Eddie's home, an attraction develops between Catherine and the handsome young Rodolpho. Eddie's incestuous love for his niece drives him into cruel criticism of Rodolpho, including the accusation that he is an opportunist who plans to marry Catherine only to obtain his U.S. citizenship papers.

When Eddie's efforts fail to influence Catherine, he brands Rodolpho a homosexual and degrades him in front of Catherine by kissing him on the lips. His desperation only serves to further alienate Catherine, however, and when she and Rodolpho make plans to marry, Eddie betrays both Marco and Rodolpho to the immigration authorities. As the two brothers are led away, Marco spits on Eddie, denouncing him as an informer.

A waterfront lawyer, Alfieri, succeeds in winning freedom for Rodolpho because of his pending marriage, but Marco is slated for deportation. While out on bail, Marco goes to the Carbone house and forces Eddie to his knees; humiliated before his family and neighbors, Eddie commits suicide by plunging a cargo hook into his chest.

Cast

Production
A View from the Bridge was filmed in separate English and French versions. Its exterior sequences were filmed on-location on the waterfront of Brooklyn, New York, where the play and the film take place. The interiors were shot at a studio in Paris, France. It was Sidney Lumet's first time directing a film outside the United States.

The film was the first time that a kiss between men was shown on screen in America, in the sequence in which an intoxicated Eddie Carbone kisses his wife Beatrice's male cousin Rodolfo in an attempt to demonstrate the latter's alleged homosexuality. However, this overture was intended as an accusation of someone being gay, rather than a romantic expression.

Unlike the play, in which Eddie is stabbed to death with his own knife in a scuffle with his wife Beatrice's cousin Marco toward the end, in the film Eddie commits suicide by plunging a cargo hook into his chest.

Reception
A View from the Bridge premiered in the United States on January 22, 1962 by Continental Film Distributors, to generally negative reviews. In Film Quarterly, Pauline Kael called the film "not so much a drama as a sentence that's been passed on the audience." Stanley Kauffmann's review for The New Republic was titled "The Unadaptable Adapted."

A more favorable review came from The New York Times film critic Bosley Crowther, who praised Sidney Lumet's realistic depiction of the Brooklyn waterfront and his choice of actors but believed that principal character Eddie Carbone lacked depth and dimension. "The rumbling and gritty quality of the Brooklyn waterfront," he wrote, "the lofty and mercantile authority of the freight ships tied up at the docks, the cluttered and crowded oppressiveness of the living rooms of the dockside slums are caught in his camera's comprehension, to pound it into the viewer's head that this is an honest presentation of the sort of personal involvement that one might watch—might spy upon—through a telescope set on Brooklyn Bridge." However, "The one great obstruction to the drama — and a fatal obstruction it becomes—is the slowly evolving demonstration that the principal character is a boor. As much as his nigh-incestuous passion and his subsequent jealousy may be credible and touching, they are low in the human emotional scale and are obviously seamy and ignoble. They haven't the universal scope of greed or envy or ambition or such obsessions as drive men to ruin."

On Rotten Tomatoes, the film has an approval rating of 80% based on reviews from 5 critics.

As of 2021, the film has never been released on home video in the United States.

Accolades
For his performance as Eddie Carbone, Raf Vallone won the David di Donatello for Best Actor.

References

External links
 

1962 films
1962 drama films
1962 LGBT-related films
French drama films
French LGBT-related films
Italian drama films
Italian LGBT-related films
English-language French films
English-language Italian films
Films set in Brooklyn
Films shot in New York City
Films shot in Paris
Films about illegal immigration to the United States
Films directed by Sidney Lumet
1960s Italian films
1960s French films